The 23rd New Zealand Parliament was a term of the New Zealand Parliament. It was elected at the 1928 general election in November of that year.

1928 general election

The 1928 general election was held on Tuesday, 13 November in the Māori electorates and on Wednesday, 14 November in the general electorates, respectively.  A total of 80 MPs were elected; 47 represented North Island electorates, 29 represented South Island electorates, and the remaining four represented Māori electorates.  844,633 voters were enrolled and the official turnout at the election was 88.1%.

Electoral boundaries

Sessions
The 23rd Parliament sat for five sessions (there were two sessions in 1931), and was prorogued on 12 November 1931.

Party standings

Start of Parliament

End of Parliament

Ministries
The Coates Ministry led by Gordon Coates of the Reform Party had come to power in May 1925. The Reform Party lost the 1928 election, suffering a humiliating defeat, dropping from 55 seats in 1925 to 28 only three years later. Parliament was called shortly after the election, Coates lost a no confidence vote and resigned as Prime Minister.

Joseph Ward formed the second Ward Ministry on 10 December 1928 as leader of the United Party, a successor of the Liberal Party.  Ward was an unwell man at this stage in life and suffered several heart attacks.  In May 1930, he was pressured by his colleagues to resign as Prime Minister.

Ward was succeeded by George Forbes, again of the United Party. The Forbes Ministry was in place until September 1931.  During the difficult times of the Great Depression, Forbes wanted to form a grand coalition with the Labour Party and the Reform Party.  Labour refused, but Reform went into a coalition government with United from September 1931.

Members

Initial MPs

By-elections during 23rd Parliament
There were a number of changes during the term of the 23rd Parliament.

Notes

References

23